The South Pacific Association of Evangelical Colleges (SPAEC) (previously the South Pacific Association of Bible Colleges (SPABC)) was an association of independent evangelical Bible colleges that operated from 1969 until the end of 2018. Colleges were located in Australia, Papua New Guinea, Vanuatu and New Zealand.

Members
Member colleges included:
Adelaide College of Ministries
Alliance College of Australia (formerly Canberra College of Theology)
Bible College of South Australia (formerly Adelaide Bible Institute)
Bible College of Western Australia (formerly West Australian Bible College)
Booth College (NSW) (formerly The Salvation Army College of Further Education)
Brisbane School of Theology (formerly Crossway College, Bible College of Queensland and Queensland Bible Institute)
Capernwray Torchbearers Australia
Carey Baptist College
Christian Leaders Training College
Dunamis International College of Ministries
Emmaus Bible College
Harvest Bible College
Kingsley College
Laidlaw College (formerly Bible College of New Zealand)
Malyon College - Queensland Baptist College of Ministries
Melbourne School of Theology (formerly Bible College of Victoria)
Morling College (offers distance education)
Nazarene Theological College
New Covenant International Bible College
Pathways College of Bible and Mission
Perth Bible College
Reformed Theological College
Sydney Missionary and Bible College
Tabor College Victoria
Tabor College Perth
Tahlee Bible College
Talua Ministry Training Centre
World View Centre for Intercultural Studies

References

External links
 

Christian universities and colleges
Evangelical seminaries and theological colleges
Seminaries and theological colleges in Australia
Universities and colleges in Oceania
Religious education in Oceania
Organizations based in Oceania
Educational institutions established in 1969
School accreditors